was a town located in Kawachi District, Tochigi Prefecture, Japan.

As of 2003, the town had an estimated population of 21,178 and a density of 675.53 persons per km2. The total area was 31.35 km2.

On January 10, 2006, Minamikawachi, along with the towns of Ishibashi and Kokubunji (both from Shimotsuga District), was merged to create the new city of Shimotsuke.

External links
 Shimotsuke official website 

Dissolved municipalities of Tochigi Prefecture